Borbash is a village in Nookat District of Osh Region of Kyrgyzstan. It is part of the Kyzyl-Oktyabr rural community (ayyl aymagy). Its population was 5,248 in 2021.

Population

References

Populated places in Osh Region